"A Call for Unity" was an open letter published in Birmingham, Alabama, on April 12, 1963, by eight local white clergymen in response to civil rights demonstrations taking place in the area at the time. In the letter, they took issue with events "directed and led in part by outsiders," and they urged activists to engage in local negotiations and to use the courts if rights were being denied, rather than to protest.

The term "outsider" was a thinly-veiled reference to Martin Luther King Jr., who replied four days later, with his famous "Letter from Birmingham Jail." He argued that direct action was necessary to protest unjust laws.

The authors of "A Call for Unity" had written "An Appeal for Law and Order and Common Sense" in January 1963.

Signatories
 C. C. J. Carpenter, D.D., LL.D., Bishop, Episcopal Diocese of Alabama
 Joseph Aloysius Durick, D.D., Auxiliary Bishop, Catholic Diocese of Mobile, Birmingham
 Milton L. Grafman, Rabbi of Temple Emanu-El, Birmingham, Alabama
 Paul Hardin, Bishop of the Alabama-West Florida Conference of the Methodist Church
 Nolan Bailey Harmon, Bishop of the North Alabama Conference of the Methodist Church
 George M. Murray, D.D., LL.D., Bishop Coadjutor, Episcopal Diocese of Alabama
 Edward V. Ramage, Moderator, Synod of the Alabama Presbyterian Church in the United States
 Earl Stallings, Pastor, First Baptist Church, Birmingham, Alabama

References

Further reading
 Bass, S. Jonathan (2001). Blessed Are the Peacemakers: Martin Luther King, Jr., Eight White Religious Leaders, and the "Letter from Birmingham Jail". Baton Rouge: LSU Press. .

External links
 
 "Letter from Birmingham Jail" as PDF and audio version

History of Alabama
United States documents
1963 documents
Open letters
1963 in Alabama